Gökören can refer to:

 Gökören, Alaca
 Gökören, Mudurnu